Mark Andrews  (born August 9, 1965) is a former competitive freestyle swimmer from Canada, who competed for his native  country at the 1988 Summer Olympics in Seoul, South Korea.

In Seoul, Andrews finished in 15th position in the 50-metre freestyle, and in ninth place with the men's 4x100-metre freestyle relay team.  He also swam for Trinidad in the 1987 Pan American Games and won a bronze medal in the 100-metre freestyle, and took the NCAA Freestyle title for Louisiana State University in 1988.  His fastest 50-yard freestyle was 19.57 seconds.

References
 sports-reference

1965 births
Living people
Canadian male freestyle swimmers
Olympic swimmers of Canada
Swimmers from Toronto
Swimmers at the 1987 Pan American Games
Swimmers at the 1988 Summer Olympics
LSU Tigers swimmers
Canadian people of Welsh descent
Trinidad and Tobago people of Welsh descent
Trinidad and Tobago male swimmers
Pan American Games bronze medalists for Trinidad and Tobago
Pan American Games medalists in swimming
Medalists at the 1987 Pan American Games